The Al Grey – Billy Mitchell Sextet is an album by trombonist Al Grey and saxophonist Billy Mitchell, released in 1961 on Argo Records.

Track listing 
 "Bluish Grey" (Thad Jones) – 4:35
 "Wild Deuce" (Gene Kee) – 3:18
 "On Green Dolphin Street" (Bronisław Kaper, Ned Washington) – 2:47
 "Bantu" (Randy Weston) – 3:05
 "Melba's Blues" (Melba Liston) – 6:40
 "Home Fries" (Kee) – 3:00
 "Grey's Blues" (Al Grey) – 4:54

Personnel 
Al Grey – trombone, baritone saxophone
Billy Mitchell – tenor saxophone, alto saxophone
 Henry Boozier – trumpet
 Gene Kee – piano, alto saxophone
Art Davis – bass
Jule Curtis – drums
Ray Barreto – congas

References 

1962 live albums
Billy Mitchell (jazz musician) live albums
Al Grey live albums
Argo Records live albums